The year 2009 is the 4th year in the history of Strikeforce, a mixed martial arts promotion based in the United States. In 2009 Strikeforce held 10 events beginning with, Strikeforce: Shamrock vs. Diaz.

Title fights

Events list

Strikeforce: Shamrock vs. Diaz

Strikeforce: Shamrock vs. Diaz was an event held on April 11, 2009 at the HP Pavilion at San Jose in San Jose, California.

Results

Strikeforce Challengers 1: Evangelista vs. Aina

Strikeforce Challengers 1: Evangelista vs. Aina was an event held on May 15, 2009 at the Save Mart Center in Fresno, California.

Results

Strikeforce: Lawler vs. Shields

Strikeforce: Lawler vs. Shields was an event held on June 6, 2009 at the Scottrade Center in St. Louis, Missouri.

Results

Strikeforce Challengers 2: Villasenor vs. Cyborg

Strikeforce Challengers 2: Villasenor vs. Cyborg was an event held on June 19, 2009 at the ShoWare Center in Kent, Washington.

Results

Strikeforce: Carano vs. Cyborg

Strikeforce: Carano vs. Cyborg was an event held on August 15, 2009 at the HP Pavilion at San Jose in San Jose, California.

Results

Strikeforce Challengers 3: Kennedy vs. Cummings

Strikeforce Challengers 3: Kennedy vs. Cummings was an event held on September 25, 2009 at the SpiritBank Event Center in Bixby, Oklahoma.

Results

Strikeforce Challengers 4: Gurgel vs. Evangelista

Strikeforce Challengers 4: Gurgel vs. Evangelista was an event held on November 6, 2009 at the Save Mart Center in Fresno, California.

Results

Strikeforce: Fedor vs. Rogers

Strikeforce: Fedor vs. Rogers was an event held on November 7, 2009 at the Sears Centre in Hoffman Estates, Illinois.

Results

Strikeforce Challengers 5: Woodley vs. Bears

Strikeforce Challengers 5: Woodley vs. Bears was an event held on November 20, 2009 at the Memorial Hall in Kansas City, Kansas.

Results

Strikeforce: Evolution

Strikeforce: Evolution was an event held on December 19, 2009 at the HP Pavilion at San Jose in San Jose, California.

Results

See also 
 List of Strikeforce champions
 List of Strikeforce events

References

Strikeforce (mixed martial arts) events
2009 in mixed martial arts